The Skaneateles Turnpike was an east–west turnpike in central New York in the United States. It began east of the village of Skaneateles and ran east across southern Onondaga and Madison counties to Richfield Springs in northern Otsego County. The road began and ended at the Cherry Valley Turnpike, part of the Great Western Turnpike system, and largely paralleled the Cherry Valley Turnpike between Skaneateles and Richfield Springs. Most of the road is now county-maintained, but a handful of sections are now part of New York state touring routes.

Route description
West of this point, the Cherry Valley Turnpike served Skaneateles and eventually connected to the Seneca Turnpike. The Skaneateles Turnpike headed generally southeastward from Clintonville, running along part of Otisco Lake before leaving the lake shore and taking a more easterly routing toward the village of Tully.

At Eaton, the turnpike veered southeast to serve Hamilton before curving back to the northeast at East Hamilton. The remaining  of the turnpike served only a handful of small hamlets, scattered across sparsely populated areas of modern Madison and Otsego counties. The largest of these were Brookfield in eastern Madison County and Leonardsville, a riverside community located just south of where the road crossed the Unadilla River. Past the river, the turnpike continued generally northeastward across the rural northwestern corner of Otsego County to the village of Richfield Springs, where it ended at the Cherry Valley Turnpike in the village center.

History
The Skaneateles Turnpike was incorporated under the name "the President and Directors of the Hamilton and Scaneatelas Turnpike" on April 2, 1806. In 1807 the company was authorized to intersect the Great Western Turnpike (now U.S. Route 20) at any point east of the west branch of the Unadilla River. The connection was ultimately made at Richfield Springs.

In western Onondaga County, the turnpike is now New York State Route 174 (NY 174), County Route 124 (CR 124), and CR 23. From CR 23's east end in Tully to West Woodstock, Madison County, it is now NY 80. While NY 80 follows NY 13 south from West Woodstock, the turnpike's path heads east to West Eaton as CR 52. Here, NY 26 joins the road, only to leave  to the east in Eaton. Between Eaton and Hamilton, the old road is Hamilton Hill Road and Eaton Street (CR 85). The remainder of the Skaneateles Turnpike between Hamilton and the Unadilla River is part of CR 70 and all of CR 72, CR 74, and CR 80. Across the river in Otsego County, the turnpike is now part of CR 21 and CR 25. A section between the two roads is locally maintained.

While most of the old turnpike is now known by other names, several sections still reference the turnpike in their road name. In Otsego County, CR 25 is named Old Skaneateles Turnpike while CR 21 and the town-maintained segment between CR 21 and CR 25 are named Skaneateles Turnpike. The turnpike's old name is also used for CR 80 in Madison County.

See also

List of county routes in Madison County, New York
List of county routes in Onondaga County, New York
List of county routes in Otsego County, New York

References

Turnpikes in New York (state)